Changual is  a  village in the Kharagpur II CD block in the Kharagpur subdivision of the Paschim Medinipur district in the state of West Bengal, India.

Geography

Location

Area overview
Kharagpur subdivision, shown partly in the map alongside, mostly has alluvial soils, except in two CD blocks in the west – Kharagpur I and Keshiary, which mostly have lateritic soils. Around 74% of the total cultivated area is cropped more than once. With a density of population of 787 per km2nearly half of the district’s population resides in this subdivision. 14.33% of the population lives in urban areas and 86.67% lives in the rural areas.

Note: The map alongside presents some of the notable locations in the subdivision. All places marked in the map are linked in the larger full screen map.

Demographics
According to the 2011 Census of India, Changual had a total population of 3,737, of which 1,892 (51%) were males and 1,645 (49%) were females. There were 445 persons in the age range of 0–6 years. The total number of literate persons in Changual was 2669 (81.08% of the population over 6 years).

.* For language details see Kharagpur II#Language and religion

Education
Changual Kandarpapur Pranabesh Vidyayatan is a Bengali-medium co-educational institution established in 1959. The school has facilities for teaching from class V to class XII. It has a library with 487 books, 1 computer and a playground.

Healthcare
Changual Block Primary Health Centre,  with 10 beds at Changual, is the major government medical facility in the Kharagpur II CD block

References

Villages in Paschim Medinipur district